The Rosmalen train accident was a railway accident next to the street Burgemeester Wolterstraat near Rosmalen railway station in Rosmalen, the Netherlands in late December 1920. In the accident two freight trains collided and three people died.

One of the two freight trains was on a side track in front of the Rosmalen railway station. The train was driving back upon the main track and collided with a freight train coming from the direction of Nijmegen. Due to the collision, the locomotive of the colliding train derailed and the following eight wagons slid in and up each other.

According to witnesses the train driver had ignored an unsafe sign. Three people died: the main conductor and two brakemen. One of them lay for 11 hours seriously injured under the rubble before he could be released. He died shortly afterwards in hospital.

Gallery

References 

Train collisions in the Netherlands
Railway accidents in 1920
1920 in the Netherlands
Events in 's-Hertogenbosch
December 1920 events
1920 disasters in the Netherlands